The Three Principles of National Reunification were proposed by General Secretary Kim Il-Sung of North Korea in 1972 and can be summarised as achieving reunification independently, unitedly, and peacefully. They comprised the following points;

1) First, national reunification should be achieved independently without reliance on outside forces and free from their interference.

2) Secondly, great  national unity should be promoted by transcending the differences in ideas, deals and systems.

3) Thirdly, national reunification should be achieved by peaceful means without resorting to arms.

The emblem of the Three Charters; the Three Principles of National Reunification is located on the Arch of Reunification located on the highway between Pyongyang and Kaesong.

References

North Korea–South Korea relations